Timeslip (Rina Patel) is a mutant superhero appearing in American comic books published by Marvel Comics. The character was the last addition to the New Warriors before the cancellation of their original series. Timeslip first appeared in New Warriors #59 (May 1995) and was created by Evan Skolnick and Patrick Zircher.

Fictional character biography

Origin
Rina Patel is an Indian mutant, born with special superhuman strength, durability, time manipulating powers, time traveling abilities and superspeed. Initially her only known special ability was to completely swap her current consciousness with her consciousness from any other point in her life, past or future. Later, she also discovered her time manipulating, superhuman strength & durability, superspeed and time travel abilities.

As a college student, Rina was seen "time-swapping" to when she was four years old as an escape from studying. At the same time, her four-year-old consciousness was time-swapped to her college-age self, causing the child version of herself to panic. Suddenly Rina's current self was ripped to another time, a bewildering vision of herself in a superhero outfit talking with the New Warriors in their Crashpad headquarters. The short episode passed, and a confused Rina decided to pay little heed to the strange future that seemed to be in store for her.

In her next appearance, Rina once again time-swapped to her own near future and found herself holding what appeared to be a dying Speedball in her arms.

Concerned for Robbie's welfare, Rina began making concerted efforts to contact and warn him of her frightening future vision. However, Speedball did not take her warnings seriously, assuming she was a "super hero stalker" of some kind. Ultimately Rina found Carlton LaFroyge (Hindsight Lad) and convinced him of her sincerity and special abilities by pushing him out of the way of an oncoming truck. This involved Rina warping time so that she seemed to be moving super-fast, an ability she had not previously realized she had.

Trying to help Rina (and her warnings) be taken seriously by the New Warriors, Hindsight Lad designed a superhero costume for her, dubbed her Timeslip, and arranged for her to meet with the team while showing off her time-warping abilities, superhuman strength, fighting abilities. Even after this demonstration and Rina's impassioned warnings, Speedball was still dubious about her predictions, while the rest of the team did not know quite what to make of her. However, Timeslip's persistence convinced the Warriors to keep her around as they tried to figure out how to prevent her future vision of Speedball's death from coming to pass.

Over time it became clear that Timeslip's visions always came true exactly as she saw them, and Robbie's apparent death was no exception. When the Sphinx appeared and, brushing the Warriors aside, killed Speedball in cold blood. He died in her arms, just as she had foreseen.

However it was ultimately revealed that the Speedball who died in Rina's arms was in fact an exact duplicate who had been created in the year 2092. This advanced biological construct was designed to take Robbie's place as a sleeper agent, tasked with preventing a deranged time-hopping villain, Advent, from rewriting future history to his liking. The Sphinx intentionally killed this Speedball duplicate because "he would have failed" to stop Advent. This brutal and seemingly senseless act of murder set in motion a chain of events that drew Rina into the New Warriors team and allowed her to stop Advent herself, saving the future and the rest of the New Warriors.

Timeslip remained with the team and was instrumental in preventing the Dire Wraith queen Volx from detonating a device that could have eliminated the special powers of thousands of superhumans. However, in helping to contain the blast, Rina seemed to lose her own special abilities. At first it was assumed she lost her powers entirely. Later she gained the powers she had before.

Civil War and after
Rina Patel was one of the former Warriors whose secret identities and home addresses were "outed" on a New Warriors hate site, a backlash from the latest incarnation of the Warriors' involvement in a catastrophe that was the catalyst of the Marvel Comics publishing event known as Civil War.  After being "outed", Rina was shown on the run from an angry mob, part of a growing anti-New Warrior (and anti-superhero in general) movement in the United States in reaction to the catastrophe.

It was also confirmed, that she regained her powers somewhen in between her last appearance in New Warriors and the events of Civil War.

Rina has been identified as one of the 142 registered superheroes who appear to have joined the Initiative.

Rina was recently seen celebrating the Holidays in San Francisco with the X-Men and other mutants still remaining after M-Day.

During the "Outlawed" storyline, Rina appears as a member of C.R.A.D.L.E. when a law is passed that forbids superheroes who are below the age of 21.

Powers and abilities
Initially, Rina Patel could exchange her consciousness with her past or future self. Eventually she was capable of limited time travel, having superhuman strength, superspeed and also employed her abilities to simulate super speed by slowing time relative to herself, much like Velocidad of the Five Lights or the Flash's enemy, Zoom.

References

Indian superheroes
Marvel Comics characters who can move at superhuman speeds
Marvel Comics characters with superhuman strength
Marvel Comics female superheroes
Marvel Comics mutants
Marvel Comics superheroes
Comics characters introduced in 1995
Fictional characters who can manipulate time